KLFD (1410 AM, "The Original") is a radio station licensed to serve Litchfield, Minnesota, United States.  The station's broadcast license is held by Mid-Minnesota Media, LLC.

KLFD broadcasts a "variety" format featuring an assortment of news, sports, informational, and talk radio programming plus a full-service mix of music and information on weekdays.  This programming also includes the Voice of Tomorrow religious broadcast and the Imagination Theater syndicated radio drama series. Wake up every morning to Q & Steve from 5:30am to 9:00am. at 1:00pm listen to Aaron in the Afternoon hosted by Aaron Imholte, a talk show featuring news, humor, sports, interviews, and pop culture talk.

History
FCC records indicate the station has been licensed since April 20, 1959. At the time, the station was owned by Meeker County Radio, Inc. Known as KLFD until a 1989 change, after spending just over two years as KQIV, the station returned to the call sign KLFD on December 6, 1991.

References

External links
KLFD official website

 KLFD Simulcast Station 95.9 FM W240DD

Radio stations in Minnesota
Radio stations established in 1959
News and talk radio stations in the United States
Meeker County, Minnesota